Prince's Building is an office tower with a six-level shopping centre, known as Landmark Prince's. Located along the western side of the southern section of Statue Square in Central, Hong Kong near Central station, the building is connected to Alexandra House and Mandarin Oriental, Hong Kong by pedestrian bridges.

First generation
The first Prince's Building was a four-storey Renaissance architecture building in 1904 on land created from the Chater reclamation, located directly south of Queen's Building, completed in 1899. The building was designed by Leigh & Orange and had similarities with the Hong Kong Club Building built in 1897. It was replaced by the present building in 1965.

The first building housed several bank and law firm offices including:
 Yokohama Specie Bank
 Bank of Taiwan
 Banque de l'Indochine
 Deacons
 Johnson Stokes & Master

Second generation

In 1963, the first building was demolished to make way for the current Prince's Building. It was designed by architecture firm Palmer & Turner. The 29 floor complex is an office and retail complex and is owned by Hongkong Land. 

In 1965, Hongkong Land constructed the first air-conditioned pedestrian bridge in Hong Kong, connecting Prince's Building to The Mandarin Hotel. This concept was later adapted by other developers, and formed the Central Elevated Walkway system.

The six levels of retail floors, now known as Landmark Prince's, house flagship stores of luxury brands including Cartier, Chanel, Van Cleef & Arpels, Hermès, A. Lange & Söhne, Baccarat, Berluti, Chopard, Christian Louboutin, Chrome Hearts, Damiani, Jaeger-LeCoultre, John Lobb, Panerai and Vacheron Constantin. Landmark Prince's is also known for smaller upmarket boutique-style shops on its second and third floors; these two retail floors are branded as "Landmark Home & Kids". 

Tenants of the office tower currently include Mayer Brown JSM, KPMG, and PricewaterhouseCoopers.

The complex adjoins Statue Square, which it surrounds together with Hong Kong Club Building, Old Supreme Court Building, Mandarin Oriental (former site of Queen's Building) and HSBC Main Building.

See also
 King's Building
 Alexandra House
 The Landmark
 Hongkong Land
 Statue Square

References

External links
 Building's page on Hongkong Land's website (archive)

Skyscraper office buildings in Hong Kong
Shopping centres in Hong Kong
Central, Hong Kong
Hongkong Land